"Question!" is a song by Armenian American heavy metal band System of a Down, released in July 2005 as the second single from their fourth studio album Mezmerize.

Release 
After the release of B.Y.O.B., the band were deciding what song to release as a single. They eventually chose "Question!" after finding out radio stations had already been playing the track.

Music video 
Shavo Odadjian produced the video (and co-directed it alongside Howard Greenhalgh) after allegedly having an image of the video in a nightmare, which consisted of a boy offering a girl berries, unaware that the berries were poisonous. It is claimed that before the dream he did not intend to produce the video and did not want any special treatment over other possible producers for being in the band, thus submitting the idea anonymously.

The video was shot in the now-closed Los Angeles Theater, which opened in 1931. Tankian described the place, "It's an amazing old theater that is due for renovation. I'm glad they haven't renovated it yet, because it has the right character for what we were looking for. It has a fairy tale vibe."

The video opens with a boy with gray hair, clothes, and skin shooting a red bird with a slingshot, which coincides with the start of the song. It then switches to a scene of the band members on a theater stage performing music for a play, similar to an orchestra playing under the pit. Based on a theme of life, death, and reincarnation, the play revolves around two lovers, a man in a dark suit and a woman in a red dress, who are shown both as children and as adults. As the music reaches its climax, the woman collapses after eating a red berry and the man screams in grief. The video closes with an intense scene of a woman giving birth followed by a shot of a newborn baby wrapped in red cloth. The color red is central to the video, linking the bird, the girl, the woman, and the baby in a cycle of rebirth.

Track listing

Personnel 

System of a Down
 Serj Tankian – lead vocals, acoustic guitar
 Daron Malakian – backing vocals, electric guitar
 Shavo Odadjian – bass
 John Dolmayan – drums, percussion

Additional personnel
 Marc Mann – string arrangements
 Vartan Malakian – artwork
 Brandy Flower – graphic design

Production
 Rick Rubin – production
 Andy Wallace – mixing
 David Schiffman – engineering
 Jason Lader – editing
 Dana Neilsen – editing
 Phillip Broussard – engineering assistance
 John O'Mahony – Pro Tools engineering
 Steve Sisco – mixing assistance
 Joe Peluso – mixing assistance

Chart positions

Certifications

References

Song recordings produced by Rick Rubin
System of a Down songs
Songs about death
2005 singles
2004 songs
Music videos directed by Howard Greenhalgh
Songs written by Serj Tankian